Edwin Morris (6 May 1921 - March 2000) was a Welsh professional footballer who played as a goalkeeper. He played eight times in the Football League for Cardiff City.

Career
Having played amateur football for Bewdley Town after World War II, Morris was signed by Cardiff City in 1948. He spent three seasons with the club, making eight league appearances, as understudy to first choice goalkeeper Phil Joslin. He was released in 1951 and went on to play for Barry Town, making over 100 appearances for the club.

References

1921 births
2000 deaths
Welsh footballers
Cardiff City F.C. players
Barry Town United F.C. players
English Football League players
Association football goalkeepers